Final Fantasy IX, a PlayStation role-playing game consisting of four CD-ROMs, featured a cast containing a variety of major and minor characters. Players could control a maximum of four characters for combat at once, with eight main playable characters in the party and a few other, temporary characters.

Concept and creation
The main characters were based on the character class archetypes from previous Final Fantasy games (for instance, Zidane is based on the Thief class while Steiner was based on the Fighter class). The series has used the same menu operated battle system in most of the games with a few minor adjustments. Each character in Final Fantasy IX has his/her own unique ability; these include summoning, black magic, white magic, blue magic and techniques such as "Jump". The characters were designed after the creation of Final Fantasy IXs plot, unlike its predecessors, VII and VIII, which had its protagonists created before the story. Both Zidane and Vivi's size and age were less than that of the characters from the above-mentioned other titles. Zidane was one of the original three characters revealed, along with Vivi and Steiner.

Original concepts and designs were created by Yoshitaka Amano. The in-game version of each character was completed by Toshiyuki Itahana, Shunkou Murase and Shin Nagasawa.

Main playable characters

Zidane Tribal

 is the main protagonist of Final Fantasy IX. Zidane, along with other characters, was designed after the creation of the game's plot, unlike its predecessors, VII and VIII, which had its protagonists created before the story. Both Zidane and Vivi's size and age were less than that of the characters from the above-mentioned other titles. He was one of the original three characters revealed, along with Vivi and Steiner. He was conceived and written by Hironobu Sakaguchi, while his appearance was designed by Yoshitaka Amano and re-interpreted by Toshiyuki Itahana. His womanizing aspect was designed by Hiroyuki Ito. Sakaguchi described him as a person who "likes girls and doesn't care for much", lacking any real objective and being carefree, but a key character nonetheless.

Zidane has shoulder-length blonde hair, blue eyes, and a prehensile monkey-like tail, as witnessed in game when Zidane hangs from his tail to evade Steiner. He can either use two daggers or a single swallow-blade as weapons. In trance form, Zidane's hair becomes longer, and his clothing is replaced with pink fur. Zidane is identified as a thief, and has the unique ability to steal items from enemies. As he is considered the main character of Final Fantasy IX, the stealing mechanic was made more important than in previous games, which means that players have ample opportunity to acquire a lot of valuable items earlier than normal through stealing them from enemies.

He was redesigned by Tetsuya Nomura in the video game Dissidia Final Fantasy. He is voiced by Romi Park and Bryce Papenbrook in the Japanese and English versions of Dissidia respectively.

At the age of sixteen, he became involved in a scheme to kidnap Princess Garnet XVII of Alexandria, organized by Regent Cid in order to distance the princess from her increasingly war-like adoptive mother, Queen Brahne. Zidane first encounters Garnet when she tries to sneak out of the palace, and, at her request, promises to do his best to kidnap her. He takes an instant liking to the princess and does not hesitate to flirt with her throughout the game. Zidane naturally adopts his role as party leader, and his personality draws many characters in the game. Near the end of the game, the player learns that Zidane is a Genome, created by Garland on the planet Terra to replace Kuja as a more powerful "Angel of Death". Jealous of his successor, Kuja cast Zidane down to Gaia, where he is found and adopted by Baku and his group of thieves, Tantalus. At the end of the game, after the party is rescued from the Iifa Tree by Kuja, Zidane chooses to go back inside the frenzied tree to save his archrival, and is pursued by its tendrils. For nearly a year it is believed that he did not survive, but makes a dramatic reappearance on stage in Alexandria in the epilogue. In addition to his original appearance, Zidane is the hero representing Final Fantasy IX in Dissidia Final Fantasy. Along with the entire cast, Zidane reappears in the prequel Dissidia 012. He also appears in Itadaki Street Portable as a playable character. He is also featured in the rhythm game Theatrhythm Final Fantasy as the main character representing Final Fantasy IX. Zidane was featured amongst three other protagonists of the video game Dissidia Final Fantasy as figurines, including Cloud Strife, Squall Leonhart, and Tidus to celebrate the series' 20th anniversary.

Vivi Orunitia

 first appears at the beginning of the game, and becomes embroiled in Tantalus's plan to kidnap Princess Garnet when he travels to Alexandria to attend a performance of the play I Want to be Your Canary. After the group find Queen Brahne's Black Mage factory in Dali, he remains with the group to search for the truth about his origins. It is later revealed that Black Mages are mindless footsoldiers, manufactured by Kuja who supplies them to Queen Brahne in order to help her conquer the Mist Continent. Vivi desperately wishes to find out the truth about his origins and the reason for his existence, fearing his purpose is nothing more than to be a soulless killing machine. He also does not understand why he is different from the rest of the Black Mages, including why he shows emotions when other Black Mages, including the Black Waltzes, do not. The truth is revealed to him by Kuja and the Black Mages in the Black Mage Village later on in the game. He learns that most Black Mages "stop" after one year, equivalent to death in humans. A conversation with the Black Mage leader suggests that Vivi was the black mage prototype built to "last longer". Vivi himself does not appear in the epilogue cutscenes, but the screen cuts to black to display his ending monologue. Instead, seven other black mages who look exactly like him appear at Garnet's seventeenth birthday celebration in Alexandria, one of whom identifies himself to Puck as "Vivi's son". Through his messages during the ending scenes, Vivi thanks Zidane for their adventures and the lessons of life, and bids everyone farewell. It is implied that he has died due to his limited lifespan.

Vivi's name in English was originally Vivi Ornitier in the Final Fantasy IX manual, though this changed in the Greatest Hits re-release. Vivi is kind and of pure heart, yet is also obedient, quiet, indecisive, and introverted. He is a Black Mage, a class of magic user who employs fire, ice, lightning, and other elements into their magic. His character design was meant to strike a balance between realism and a comic-like style, while taking inspiration from the style employed for the characters in the film The Dark Crystal. When designing Final Fantasy IX, the designers made a point of designing a part of the world around Vivi due to him being a key character of the story. An early scene in FFIX features various characters posing as members of a play; while he does not participate in the final version, a previous version has him participating after coaxed by Zidane Tribal in order to avoid being arrested.

With the ability to cast black magic, Vivi's appearance is based on the black mage characters from previous Final Fantasy games. He wears a blue costume, a tall hat, and has no facial features beyond a set of yellow eyes. In addition to the original game, Vivi makes an appearance in the Disney/Square Enix crossover Kingdom Hearts II. He makes minor appearances in manuals for both Dissidia Final Fantasy and Final Fantasy Origins. He is also featured in the rhythm game Theatrhythm Final Fantasy as a subcharacter representing Final Fantasy IX. The character was featured as a figurine multiple times.

Since appearing in Final Fantasy IX, Vivi has received largely positive reception. During the 2006 Edinburgh Interactive Entertainment Festival, Edge editor Margaret Robertson used Vivi as an example of an emotionally engaging character in the Final Fantasy series, stating that gamers knew that something tragic would happen with Vivi in the end.

In Kingdom Hearts II, Vivi is voiced by Ikue Ōtani in the Japanese version and Melissa Disney in the English version. In World of Final Fantasy he is voiced by Kath Soucie in English instead.

Adelbert Steiner
 is the Captain of the Knights of Pluto, the only group of male soldiers in Alexandria's entire military force. Steiner usually has a massive frown to go with a grouchy disposition. Steiner is unusual amongst Final Fantasy characters, in that while the game allows the player to choose his name, the name the player chooses becomes his surname instead of his first name. For instance, if the player entered the name "Steve", the character would be called "Captain Adelbert Steve". This also makes him one of the few Final Fantasy characters to be called by both the first and last name given in the game's manual during actual gameplay.

Steiner always wears a full suit of heavy armour throughout the game, giving him a bulky appearance that is more silly than menacing. Clanking noises accompany his footsteps and his frequent fits of pique, in which he hops up and down to express his anger. His armour is often remarked on by others, such as when Zidane refers to him as "Rusty" early in the game. Steiner only seems to mind this once (though his armour never actually appears damaged or ill-maintained).

Steiner meets Zidane and the Tantalus group during their performance of a popular play, "I Want To Be Your Canary". He follows the Tantalus group after their "kidnapping" of Princess Garnet because of his oath to protect the Princess from danger. He joins forces with Zidane, whom he hates because he's a thief, but is willing to put up with just about anything to ensure Princess Garnet's safety. When the party learns of the Queen's role in the attacks on Burmecia, Steiner finds himself torn up inside at the fact that such horrible deeds could be committed by the person he's dedicated his life to defending. He resolves this conflict by transferring his loyalty fully to Garnet.

Despite his disdain for most of the members of the group, Steiner has a humble respect for Vivi, admiring his magical abilities and referring to him as "Master Vivi". When both Steiner and Vivi are in the party, Steiner has access to the Magic Sword ability, which allow Vivi to charge Steiner's sword with the power of any of his black magic abilities, although MP consumption is limited to Steiner alone.

Steiner's love interest is his ex-rival, General Beatrix, which occurs as a result of Eiko's failed love letter to Zidane, presented in a comedy of errors fashion.

As the game progresses, Steiner's experiences and resolution of personal conflicts allow his personality to soften somewhat towards the end and he is able to form not only a respectful friendship with Zidane but also a relationship with Beatrix.

Garnet Til Alexandros XVII / Dagger

, is the heroine of Final Fantasy IX. Garnet is the Princess of Alexandria, one of four major nations located on Gaia's Mist Continent. She is the only heir to the royal throne. A beautiful young woman, Garnet is well spoken and highly educated, but also possessed of a strong will. However, due to her sheltered upbringing she is also shy and quite naive. In battle, she can cast white magic and summon eidolons.

Princess Garnet (named Sarah at the time) was born in Madain Sari, the "Village of the Summoners" located on Outer Continent. Madain Sari was attacked and destroyed by Garland with the Invincible before Garnet had reached her sixth birthday; the Invincible appeared to her as an "eyeball" in the sky. She and her mother fled from the village by a small boat and traveled to Mist Continent. Her mother did not survive and died at some unknown point before the boat wrecked in Alexandria Harbor where they were found by Doctor Tot. Coincidentally, the little girl looked almost identical to Alexandria's former Princess Garnet, who had died shortly beforehand due to illness. However, the child had a horn. As an alternative to publicly announcing the death of Alexandria's beloved Princess, the King of Alexandria ordered the child's horn be removed and the little girl assumed Princess Garnet's identity. Garnet has repressed her memories of her former life in Madain Sari; the only remaining memories she has of her former life are a recurring nightmare involving her escape from the village's destruction and "Melodies of Life", a song that only she and Eiko know.

The King of Alexandria died some time before the beginning of the game, leaving Queen Brahne in complete control of Alexandria and Garnet as the sole heir to the throne. At her fifteenth birthday, a year before the beginning of the game, a suspicious man known as Kuja appeared in the Castle; ever since Kuja's initial arrival at Alexandria Castle, Queen Brahne's behavior had become more hostile. Upon hearing that the theater troupe Tantalus would be performing Garnet's favorite play (Lord Avon's "I Want to be Your Canary") in Alexandria on Garnet's sixteenth birthday, Garnet resolved to stowaway on board the Prima Vista, Tantalus' theater ship, as it returned to its home port in Lindblum where she could consult with her father's long time friend Regent Cid Fabool IX about her adoptive mother's radical behavior (not knowing that Cid had already requested Tantalus to kidnap her precisely because he feared Queen Brahne's increasingly erratic behavior and wanted Garnet away from her). After their escape, Garnet assumes the alias of Dagger to try to keep a low profile among the commoners, a name she continues to employ for the majority of the game. The robe that Garnet wears to conceal her identity during her escape is white trimmed with red triangles, which is the design of Final Fantasy's typical White Mages' robe. Despite this visual cue, Garnet's role in battle is more suited towards Summoning with White Magic as a supplement, which directly contrasts to Eiko, who is best suited towards White Magic with Summoning as a supplement.

After the forceful extraction of her eidolons by the twins Zorn and Thorn later in the game, Garnet admits that she had been afraid of her summoning powers. After hearing about what had happened in Cleyra with Odin and the orders to execute Garnet after the eidolons were extracted from her, Garnet resolves to utilize her special powers to help cure her mother of her endless greed. Soon after, the party encounters the thunder god Ramuh, who helps Garnet decide to release her true powers in order to summon her eidolons. After this point in the story, Garnet can learn to summon every eidolon extracted from her, and even some that she gains during the story, such as the water dragon god Leviathan.

After Queen Brahne's death, Garnet is crowned Queen. During her coronation, Kuja attacks with Bahamut, forcing Garnet to draw out the legendary eidolon Alexander, who is summoned with the help of Eiko. Alexander destroys Bahamut, but Garland takes control of the Invincible and uses it to eliminate Alexander, destroying much of Alexandria with it. Succumbing to the recent traumatic stress, Garnet becomes mute in her depression until she can finally come to terms with her emotions late in the game. In this psychological state, she often has difficulty concentrating during battle, resulting in the occasional failure to perform actions such as White Magic and Summoning. She is also unable to go into Trance in this state, and she does not pose at the end of battles.

After the events in Kuja's palace, the party returns to Lindblum, only to find that Queen Garnet has gone missing. Zidane knows full well where she is, and rushes off to Alexandria Kingdom. There, he finds Garnet at her mother's grave, contemplating her path in life. After an impassioned speech to Zidane, Garnet snatches his dagger (the same one that helped her in picking an alias) and slices off most of her hair, symbolizing the severing of ties to her former weak self.

Event designer Kazuhiko Aoki felt that the scene where Garnet cuts her hair was an important one in the story of Final Fantasy IX. He explains that it is a quiet moment among otherwise frenetic action and was important to the game's pacing. Aoki was worried about how Garnet would be handled with this and told the writers that they would have to effectively write two Garnets, one with long hair and one with short. Event planner Nobuaki Komoto found this difficult, adding that players tended to have different images of Garnet in their heads. He felt that a person's thoughts on the character are reflected by which depiction they think of. While the development team referred to her as Dagger, the nickname she chooses to disguise her identity, most players still referred to her as Garnet. Garnet was first revealed in a Coca-Cola advertisement featuring other characters from Final Fantasy IX. Garnet also appears in Dissidia Final Fantasy Opera Omnia, where she is voiced by Mamiko Noto.

Amarant Coral
Amarant Coral is the last character to join the party. In the game Amarant has also been called "Red" and in his introductory battle he's identified as "Scarlet Hair". He fights using various gloves or knuckles, much like the monk character class in other Final Fantasy games, but also possesses the "Throw" command, normally associated with the ninja class. His mind is filled with rules of fighting, the biggest of them being "The Victorious Live, and the Defeated Die". He holds a grudge against Zidane, the reasons of which are initially undisclosed. Amarant's combative nature and arrogant attitude often leads to conflict, but eventually his personality begins to change under Zidane's influence.

Amarant lives by a harsh code where "only the strong survive". Very little is revealed regarding Amarant's extended past; even he can only recall that his first real memory "is of the face of a guy I had to fight. I only found meaning in life through combat". The warrior he wanted to challenge was Zidane but he never got the chance to face him until he met him in Madain Sari, while tracking down Garnet alongside a bounty hunter named Lani, who seems to have a crush on him that Amarant himself seems unaware of. Amarant loses the battle and wishes to die like the honorable fighter he is, but Zidane refuses.

Amarant's reputation as a fighter made him feared in Treno, so King, the owner of one of Treno's waterfront mansions and auction house, hired Amarant as a security guard. When the thief Zidane raids the mansion, he frames Amarant, who becomes a wanted man with a considerable bounty on his head. Subsequently, a wanted poster of Amarant can be seen at the inn in Treno. Amarant does not divulge this information until a conversation with Freya (who finds the story very amusing) outside the auction house in Disc 3, keeping the reasoning for his grudge towards Zidane (who does not remember him) secret for a significant portion of the game. Afterwards, Amarant works as a mercenary for hire. He's summoned by Queen Brahne to retrieve Princess Garnet's pendant and assassinate Vivi, and he takes the job after learning that Zidane is traveling with the two. Another bounty hunter, Lani, arrives first and holds Eiko hostage, demanding that the princess relinquish the pendant. Compelled by a sense of fairness, Amarant drops in on the pair and saves Eiko. He challenges Lani, who gives up the pendant and retreats. He then turns to duel with Zidane. After losing the fight, Amarant returns the pendant and demands that Zidane deliver the finishing blow. Zidane refuses, and, confused by the thief's mercy, Amarant decides to follow Zidane in order to understand his power.

While with the party, Amarant remains an aloof and dismissive character (even to the point of not performing a victory dance at the end of a battle). His "lone wolf" persona culminates during the raid on Ipsen's Castle, where Amarant seeks to prove that working alone "beats working in a team any day", and sets off in search of a set of mirrors alone. However, after finding the mirrors Amarant falls and nearly dies; he is quickly saved by Zidane, who had re-entered the castle having already made it out with the party and noticed that Amarant hadn't. Amarant is again confused by Zidane's willingness to help him, and his personality gradually begins to change under Zidane's influence (to the point of finally performing a victory dance at the end of battles). On Terra, Amarant concludes that "blind pursuit of power is a meaningless vice".

Freya Crescent

 is Burmecian, a race of anthropomorphic rats (according to many indications in the game, and by Square) who mainly live in two cities, Burmecia and Cleyra. Freya's name is homonymous with that of the Norse goddess Freyja, while her surname is homonymous with the English word crescent.

Her character design was meant to strike a balance between realism and a comic-like style, while taking inspiration from the style employed for the characters in the film The Dark Crystal. She was initially known as Freija. She is a member of a race of anthropomorphic rats called Burmecians who mainly live in two cities, Burmecia and Cleyra. Her class is Dragon Knight.

Freya's job (or class) is Dragon Knight. Unlike the Dragon Knights of other Final Fantasy games, Freya possesses a set of special skills in addition to her job's traditional ability — a common theme in Final Fantasy IX. These skills are known as "Dragoon" skills and offer a range of attack, healing, and status-changing effects.

Freya is originally from Burmecia, but when met in the game, she has not been home for years. When the man she loved, Sir Fratley, left on a mission but never returned, she left home to find out what became of him, promising never to return until she found the truth. After a period in Lindblum, she headed out to wander the world. Freya returns to Lindblum to compete in the "Festival of the Hunt" around the same time that Zidane and Tantalus return from their mission to kidnap Princess Garnet.

Freya is reunited with Sir Fratley during Alexandria's attack on Cleyra. Her joy is cut short when he reveals that he has lost his memory and does not remember her at all. Freya is shattered, but when Fratley leaves again, she says nothing. During her search, she prepared herself for the worst; knowing that he's alive was relief enough, even if he had no memory of her.

During the ending scenes of the game, Freya is reunited with Sir Fratley, having returned to Burmecia to help with the reconstruction. Sir Fratley has not yet regained (and may never regain — this is not clear) his lost memories, but nonetheless finds himself falling in love all over again with the woman he had left behind five years ago.

Quina Quen
 is an eighty-nine-year-old Qu of indeterminate gender (however, while given the pronoun of "s/he", the character mainly has masculine pronouns such as "him" and "his" attributed to him with no sign of a "her", giving many the impression that the character is a male). They live primarily in the Mist Continent's Qu's Marsh. Quina's master, Quale, wants Quina to travel the world so that they will learn that there's more to life than food. Like the rest of the Qu Tribe, Quina speaks in broken English. Quina's unique ability is called Blue Magic (Blu Magic in the battle menu) which allows them to use enemy abilities acquired in battle by using the Eat command on certain enemies. Quina's philosophy is that there are only two things: "things you can eat and things you no can eat". Their favorite food is frogs. Quina is separated from the rest of the party at several points in the game.

During Disc 1 of the game, Quina is an optional character. They join the party in the first disc only if the player travels to Qu's Marsh (Quina's and Quale's home) near the Lindblum Dragon's Gate. If the players do not recruit Quina then, they can be recruited in the same place during Disc 2, at which point having Quina join the party is a mandatory requirement of finding a way to get to the Outer Continent, and making progress through the game.

Quina's motive for joining the party is not out of a desire to save the world (at least not until they are eventually made aware of how high the stakes are), but rather as an opportunity to taste different foods from all around Gaia. As a result, they do not hold a particularly high interest in the dramatic events that unfold during the course of the story (unless food is involved somehow), but nonetheless fights hard alongside Zidane and the rest of the party to achieve their goal of saving it from Brahne, and then from Kuja.

Later in the game, Zidane, Vivi, and Quina can visit Quan's dwelling (near Treno, where Vivi grew up), and Quina will see a whole room of nonexistent food. Moving outside, Quina and Vivi (and the newly arrived Quale) meet with Quan's ghost (something that Zidane can mysteriously not see occur). Quan commends both Vivi and Quina for their vivid, valuable imaginations and reprimands Quale for seeing the world too literally. It is at this point that Quina fully understands what they've gotten out of traveling with Zidane and decides that they want to travel the world in search of even more "yummy-yummies". Quina's role in the rest of the game is limited to a secondary role except in the closing, where Quina is seen in the kitchen of Alexandria Castle, preparing a feast for Garnet's seventeenth birthday celebration.

Eiko Carol
 is one of the playable characters that joins the party in the second disc of the game. She is the only person who appears in the game with a Summoner's Horn. While Eiko and Garnet both share White Magic and Summoner abilities, Eiko uses primarily white magic with her summoner powers taking a secondary role, indicated by the order of said skills on the battle menu. Her summon abilities are usually holy-based summons or summons that add supporting effects. Some examples are Phoenix, which revives all unconscious party members, and Madeen, which causes Holy damage.

Eiko is only six years old. She is one of the two last surviving Summoners of Madain Sari (the other being Garnet). Eiko's family was not in Madain Sari when it was destroyed by Garland. They returned to the ruins of the village four years later, when Eiko was very young. Eiko's parents died early, when she was only three years old, leaving her grandfather to raise her, but he died as well, when she was five. Fortunately for Eiko, the moogles in the area decided to take care of her. She became very mature for her age and helped them as well, stealing food from the nearby village of Conde Petie for them when it was needed. Zidane and the rest of the party found her caught in a tree after she fled the scene of one of her thefts. After they got her down, she decided to show them Madain Sari and then to join the party, despite the fact that her grandfather had told her not to leave until she was sixteen. Eiko develops a huge crush on Zidane, and considers Garnet to be her rival for his affections, though gives up her pursuit of him when it becomes clear to her that Zidane's true affections lie mainly with Garnet, not with her.

Eiko has a guardian female moogle who goes by the name of Mog. During an extraction of Eiko's eidolons (the same process Thorn and Zorn used on Garnet/Dagger in Alexandria) Mog goes into a trance to protect Eiko and transforms into Madeen. After the battle, she gives Eiko the ribbon she wore so that Eiko can summon her at will. After defeating Kuja, one of the final scenes in the game shows Eiko referring to Cid and Hilda as her parents. Although the Regent had never established an adoption, his wife, Hilda, acknowledges it.

In World of Final Fantasy, she is voiced by Hisako Kanemoto in Japanese, and Jessie Flower in English.

Antagonists

Kuja
 is the primary antagonist of Final Fantasy IX. A gunrunner obsessed with power and its application, he is ambitious, cruel, narcissistic, sinister and ruthless. Well versed in the arts, Kuja has a great fondness for classical works such as Lord Avon's play "I Want To Be Your Canary". Kuja emulates the role of a traditional villain, including such elements as monologuing.

Kuja was the first Genome with a soul, created to be Garland's "angel of death". He hides his tail in an attempt to be rid of his past and be independent. Despite his power, Garland also created Zidane, who was supposed to eventually grow more powerful than Kuja, and gave Kuja a very limited life-span so that he would die shortly afterwards, deeming him too dangerous to live any longer than needed. Kuja reacts to this by dumping Zidane on Gaia. He then proceeds to far exceed Garland's expectations when he single-handedly wreaks havoc on Gaia, but at the same time plots to gain the power to overthrow Garland. Garland intervenes, however, when Kuja tries to obtain the eidolon Alexander, saying that Kuja has lost sight of his mission. Kuja is then determined to obtain an eidolon more powerful than Alexander so that he can kill Garland. He kidnaps Eiko at his Desert Palace and attempts to extract her Eidolons in the catacombs within Mount Gulug. Though this attempt failed because of Eiko's Mog going into Trance, Kuja realized the true potential of trance, set off by a hatred for one's environment. He then absorbs the souls of the Invincible, making himself more powerful. He confronts Zidane and his party on Terra after they have already fought Garland. At the end of the battle, Kuja goes into a trance and casts Ultima, overwhelming the party. He then kicks Garland off a cliff, but Garland's voice still telepathically remains in Zidane and Kuja's minds. Kuja's ego shatters when Garland tells him that he is not, as he had always thought, immortal, and the resulting panic and rage leads him to destroy his homeworld of Terra. Deeming it "unfair" for the world to exist without him, Kuja plans to destroy the crystal that all life originates from to destroy all life. Garland does not fade away until after the party is halfway through Memoria. Kuja enters Memoria, which appears apparently due to the destruction of Terra, and attempts to destroy the crystal, before which he is confronted by Zidane and his party. After a heated fight, Kuja casts Ultima again, declaring that it is not fair for everyone else to live if he must die, this time sending Zidane and his party to the Hill of Despair, presumably a plane of death. This Ultima barrage also destroys the crystal, prompting Necron's appearance. The party defeats Necron, however, saving the world. This also stops Gaia's assimilation into Terra, but they are once again alive, and Kuja decides to save them by teleporting them out of the Iifa tree. Zidane decides to save Kuja, but he is too late. When Zidane reaches Kuja, Kuja realizes that his whole life was misguided. The scene that follows shows the Iifa Tree's roots converging on both of them; while Zidane is shown alive in the ending, Kuja's fate is unknown at the game's conclusion, though it is presumed that he is still alive and has turned over a new leaf, given his subsequent appearances in later Final Fantasy games.

Kuja is the villain representing Final Fantasy IX in Dissidia: Final Fantasy and its sequels Dissidia 012 and Dissidia NT. In the latter game, however, he is not much of a villain at all and appears to have reformed. In these games, he is voiced by Akira Ishida in the Japanese versions and JD Cullum in the English versions.

Queen Brahne
 is the obese Queen of Alexandria and adoptive mother of Garnet/Dagger. As Princess Garnet testifies several times throughout the game's story, Queen Brahne was formerly a kind and well-liked ruler of the kingdom of Alexandria. Around the Princess's 15th birthday, however, the King passed on and a strange man known as Kuja began to show his face around the royal palace. Over the passing of the next year, the Princess begins to notice changes in her mother's behaviors. In actuality, Kuja had convinced Brahne to begin to create an army of Black Mages in order to wage war on the kingdoms of the Mist Continent, Lindblum, Burmecia, and Cleyra. Kuja told Brahne of the summoning powers that her adopted daughter possessed, which only acted to fuel her greed. The power to summon would surely bring the other kingdoms down to kneel before her. Kuja claims all along that Brahne wanted to wage a war of conquest, and that he merely "gave her a little push", suggesting that Kuja exploited her grief over the king's death to manipulate her into carrying out his goals.

Because of this revelation, Brahne orders Zorn and Thorn to extract the eidolons from Princess Garnet, then execute her for treason against Alexandria. The twins are able to successfully extract all the eidolons from the Princess, but are found by Zidane and the others and quickly run away. Intercepted by the Queen's most worthy knight Beatrix, the party explains the Queen's orders to execute the Princess. At this time, it dawns on Beatrix that it was the greed of Queen Brahne that utilized the Dark Matter to summon Odin upon Cleyra, killing hundreds of Cleyrans. Beatrix then vows to help bring the Queen around to her senses, in essence joining Zidane in his struggles against the Alexandrian military.

Later on at the Iifa Tree, Brahne summons Bahamut in the attempt to kill Kuja, but Garland's airship the Invincible appears and redirects the eidolon's attack on Brahne's armada, killing countless soldiers and forcing Brahne to escape in a hasty retreat. Queen Brahne, in the arms of her adopted daughter on a nearby beach, began to realize how foolish she had been under Kuja's control, and asked for forgiveness from her daughter. She died seconds later in Garnet's arms, and stirred anger within the entire party against Kuja for manipulating the kingdoms like he had.

Throughout the game, Kuja refers to Queen Brahne as the "Elephant Lady", an evident sign that he does not value her more than a pawn in his scheme to cause chaos between the kingdoms. Brahne is able to summon three different Eidolons at different times throughout the game: Odin was summoned from the Dark Matter to destroy the kingdom of Cleyra; Atomos was summoned to destroy Lindblum, although it only managed to critically damage the castle, not destroy it; and Bahamut was summoned from a Garnet at the Iifa Tree in order to kill Kuja. All of these eidolons originally belonged to Princess Garnet, but were forcefully extracted by Zorn and Thorn under the Queen's orders.

Zorn and Thorn
Zorn and Thorn are first seen in the castle at Alexandria when Princess Garnet first makes her escape and immediately report it to General Beatrix and Queen Brahne. Queen Brahne's court jesters perform all the dirty work for her and have the odd habit of speaking in constant antimetabole, with Zorn speaking the words in the proper order, and Thorn reversing them (this pattern, however, never occurs in the original Japanese release). The two act as field commanders, having been present during the attack on Burmecia, exclusively issuing orders to the Black Mage Army. They also have the unique ability to extract Eidolons from summoners, taking Garnet's Eidolons for Brahne to use in her conquests. The two later align themselves with Kuja after they lost face with Brahne. They kidnap Eiko so Kuja can have access to her Eidolons, but are knocked down by Eiko and her newly discovered Eidolon Madeen. Kuja reveals that Zorn and Thorn are actually two halves of a double headed monster named Meltigemini, which Kuja uses to cover his escape as Zidane and company are forced to defeat the fused jesters once and for all. The origins of the two are unknown and it is not indicated how long their tenure with Queen Brahne was. Since Kuja had stated that Zorn and Thorn were part of a greater, single entity, one can assume that Kuja had created the two to facilitate Brahne's manipulation, but this is only one of many theories of where the twins originate from. Similarities have been drawn with the characters of Rosencrantz and Guildenstern in Shakespeare's Hamlet.

Garland

 was made leader of Terra when the original inhabitants of Terra went into their 'Deep Sleep'. He is responsible for overseeing the Genomes, and has created the three "Angels of Death" including Kuja, Zidane Tribal, and Mikoto. He was responsible for the destruction of Madain Sari, using the red globe that flashes a mysterious "eye" below the invincible battleship to attack.

Garland was defeated at Pandemonium by Zidane and his party, only to be confronted by Kuja. Garland was too weak to fight back against him and he was thrown to his death. However Garland's spirit lived on and assisted the party during their journey through Memoria.

The main antagonist in the first Final Fantasy was also named Garland.

Necron
 is the game's final boss, despite not being the main villain. A multi-dimensional being, Necron appears after Trance Kuja destroys the crystal, the source of life. With the crystal's destruction, Necron decides to proceed with its original task to return all existence to a "zero world", a world where nothing exists and there can be no pain or sorrow. It is ultimately defeated by Zidane and company, yet vows that so long as life exists, so shall it.

Other major characters

Tantalus
Baku, Blank, Cinna, Marcus, Ruby, and the Nero Brothers are Zidane's friends and fellow members of Tantalus. They pose as actors to steal various items. Although Ruby is a member, she prefers to overlook the group's less-than-honorable dealings as long she gets a chance to pursue her dream of being an actress. Blank, Cinna and Marcus join the party intermittently throughout Disc 1, making them technically player characters, but they do not have the extensive character development, skillsets and membership duration of the previous eight.

The petrification of Blank while escaping the Evil Forest early in the game compels Marcus to look for a potion called SuperSoft to undo the petrification. The duo go back to Alexandria Castle to assist Zidane in escaping from the clutches of Zorn and Thorn.

After the abduction of Princess Garnet from Alexandria, Ruby is accidentally left inside the town, where she can be found for the remainder of the game. Ruby decides to open up a miniature theater in one of the back alleys of Alexandria. Sometimes when speaking with Moogles, Zidane will hear that Ruby has sent him a letter. One notable letter requests actors for her theater, which Zidane helps by introducing the idea to the star Lowell in Lindblum, who rushes off to Alexandria at once (although when he gets there, he says the theater is much too small for a man of his talents). Ruby speaks in a southern accent in the American version of the game, and is referred to by Garnet as the "lady with the strange accent". It also appears that Ruby and Blank have feelings for one another, although tend to show it in a rather aggressive way.

The Nero triplets, unique in appearance with dog-like heads and twin claws on each arm for hands, appear as comic relief, and often end their sentences with an exclamation mark. Unlike Zenero and Benero, Genero is not actually a member of Tantalus, instead re-uniting with his brothers in Alexandria in Disk 3 after returning from his 'training'.

Baku is the leader of the whole Tantalus troupe, and acts as a cruel King in the play, "I Want to Be Your Canary". He is the one who adopts a young Zidane after the genome first finds himself on a jetty at the Lindblum Grand Harbor without much knowledge of his origins. Often ends his conversations with a loud guffaw. His equally powerful sneeze unfortunately occurs at the most inopportune of times, most notably at the meeting between Captain Steiner and General Beatrix. Baku also has a tendency to trip and fall flat on his face in combat, usually while sparring with his band. Baku is a strict leader, beating members who disobey him. When Cinna stayed at South Gate to feast on bundt cake instead of returning to Lindblum to update the rest of the band on the search for a cure for Blank as Baku ordered, Baku beat him with his "Super Tornado Tantalus Punch" for disobeying. Zidane also relates how Baku beat him for leaving the band to search for his birthplace.

During an aerial battle at Memoria near game's end, Baku and several other Tantalus members can be seen onboard one of the defensive airships, though this is their last appearance aside from their brief scene in the epilogue of the game.

Beatrix

Beatrix is a general as well as the head of the army of Alexandria. Her character design was meant to strike a balance between realism and a comic-like style, while taking inspiration from the style employed for the characters in the film The Dark Crystal. Beatrix is famous for her sword, Save the Queen, and for her powerful ability, Seiken. Her Seiken abilities act as references to other Final Fantasy games, particularly VII's Climhazzard skill, which is one of Cloud Strife's Limit Breaks. Meanwhile, Stock Break and Shock are similar to the Magic Knight abilities in Final Fantasy Tactics, while her other ability, Thunder Slash may also be a reference to this game as it is similar to Lightning Stab. Shock is also General Leo's special command in Final Fantasy VI.

Little is known about Beatrix's past, save that she grew up in a middle-class family in the city of Treno. Visits to Alexandria led her to like the city. After her 16th birthday, she decided to move to Alexandria and join the all-female Alexandrian army. This led to years of battle and intense training allowing her to become a captain and, eventually, a general heading the Alexandrian Army. During this time, she became acquainted with the head of the Knights of Pluto, Captain Adelbert Steiner.

Beatrix loyally served Queen Brahne as she waged war against the neighboring kingdoms. She initially served as an antagonist to Zidane and his companions, facing them in battle on three occasions. It is unclear whether Beatrix had ever questioned the Queen until immediately after the attack on Cleyra. Beatrix was finally convinced to defy the Queen during Zidane and company's rescue of Princess Garnet in Alexandria. Along with Freya and Steiner, Beatrix remained behind to allow the rest of the party to escape. What happened to the three remains a mystery until late in the game.

After the Queen's death, Beatrix was again seen in Alexandria, this time serving under the newly crowned Garnet. Around this time, there was a complex miscommunication about a love letter made by Eiko to Zidane, presented in the style of a comedy of errors, which ultimately resulted in a romance between Steiner and Beatrix.

During Kuja's attack on Alexandria, she and Steiner defended the city. However, she went missing due to the chaos caused by the Eidolons, Bahamut and Alexander. Once again, the focus of the plot does not reveal the precise details of what happened to her. It is later revealed that she had in fact survived and remained in Alexandria to help rebuild the city.

General Beatrix later appears captaining the Red Rose flying with the airships of Lindblum in order to protect the Invincible as it entered Memoria. Following Necron's defeat, Beatrix appears to renounce her position as a knight and head of the Alexandrian army, until she is later confronted by Steiner, who pleads with her to stay so that they may "protect the queen together", at which point they officially begin their relationship. She is shown in the final sequence of the game holding the Save the Queen high in the air with Steiner.

Regent Cid Fabool IX

 is the present ruler of Lindblum. He was turned into an oglop by his wife, Hilda, because of his womanizing. Cid is a technology expert who is fond of creating new airships. He was best friends with Garnet's father and ordered Tantalus to kidnap Garnet because he was concerned for her safety, based on the erratic and abnormal tendencies of her mother as of late.

After Lindblum is destroyed, Zidane and his party attempt to turn him back into a human, but fail, and instead turn him into a frog (much to Quina's confusion). His restoration to human form was possible only after liberating the then imprisoned Lady Hilda from Mount Gulug, after it is realized only the one who casts the spell can be the one to reverse it.

At the end of the game, it seems that Cid and Hilda have adopted Eiko, because she calls them "father" and "mother" (much to Cid's surprise).

Black Mages
Black Mages are mages created by Kuja and they live in a forest on the Outer Continent as a hidden colony. Unlike the other, golem-like mages seen previously throughout the game, these Black Mages have gained sentient thought, heavily resembling Vivi in their uncertainty about the world. They are afraid of humans initially, believing that all humans want to use them for war. However, despite their rather traumatic origins, the Mages maintain a childlike wonder and optimism about the world and seek to discover the wonders of life through several projects, such as the raising of their town Chocobo egg which later hatches into a Chocobo they name Bobby Corwen. Later in the game, the colony comes to realize that their lives are limited (estimated to be roughly one year), and decide to help Kuja in exchange for an extension on their lives. Of course Kuja was lying, and Zidane, Vivi, and the rest of the party help the village to realize that what is important is how a person lives his or her life, not how long his or her life is. Throughout the game, Vivi takes on a big brother role to the Black Mages in the hidden village, as he has seen much more of the world than they, and he has the power to help Zidane stand up to Kuja. They do not identify each other by name, but rather by the number of their manufacture. Their leader is No. 288.

Black Waltzes
Kuja's production of the Black Mage dolls was supplemented with three versions of a more powerful model subsequently named the Black Waltzes, each iteration more powerful than the previous. They are named after the waltz, a type of ballroom dance that has 3 beats to the measure, signifying that there are exactly three of them. The appearance of the Black Waltzes is very similar to the Black Mages, but differs in that the Black Mages have a very neutral appearance whereas the Black Waltzes have a more stylized appearance. Black Waltzes also sport a set of black feathered wings. The individual appearance of the Black Waltzes varies slightly, and each model is more elegant than the previous. For instance, Black Waltz no. 1 wears shabby clothing reminiscent of peasantry, Black Waltz no. 2 wears a long robe, and Black Waltz no. 3 wears a fur-lined coat. Each iteration is also more slender than the previous. Black Waltz no. 2 is unique in that it sports a large set of antlers and constantly floats as it has no visible legs.

Black Waltzes also differ from Black Mages in that they have been given free will from their creators. They do not consider themselves to be part of the Black Mage army, but rather that they are separate and superior to the "soulless dolls". Despite being able to think and reason, they do not truly exhibit emotions: instead they simulate them, which is one trait they share with ordinary Black Mages. The Waltzes were assigned to follow orders and answer directly to Queen Brahne herself, and were dispatched one by one to capture Princess Garnet immediately after her flight/kidnapping with the additional instruction not to harm Princess Garnet herself. In battle, they will not attack Princess Garnet, and when she is the last remaining character they will cast Sleep on her to capture her. Since their retrieval of Princess Garnet is their only mission revealed in the game and each one is destroyed during this mission, it is unknown what capacity they served the Queen beyond this function.

Each Black Waltz casts magic of a level and Black Magic element corresponding to their numbers, Black Waltz no. 1 casts "Blizzard", Black Waltz no. 2 casts "Fira", and Black Waltz no. 3 casts "Thundaga". Black Waltz no. 1, uncharacteristic to typical Black Mages has the ability to summon a monster (Sealion) to aid him in battle. Black Waltz no. 2 proved to be powerful enough to survive its first encounter with the party, but was so heavily damaged that its mental capacity was severely affected and could no longer process any thoughts beyond its mission. Black Waltz no. 3 also demonstrated that it has considerable skill in piloting small airships (even though the airship was crashed into the South Gate due to carelessness and the Black Waltz not paying attention). It is unknown if the other two Black Waltzes have similar skills.

Minor characters

Artemicion
Artemicion was a purple and black Moogle who is in charge of the Mognet mail delivery syndicate. He relies on Zidane and his friends to deliver mail after he uses up all of Mognet Central's supply of Superslick to oil his fur, depleting it and causing the machinery to break down. Artemicion makes a second appearance as a member of a group of bandits in Final Fantasys spin-off game Crystal Chronicles, and also owns a shop in the video game Kingdom Hearts II in the world Space Paranoids.

Stiltzkin
 is a world-travelling Moogle who is dressed in tiger-striped clothing. On occasion he appears throughout the game at various locations and sells Zidane and company various useful items to finance his journey. He also sends letters to other moogles to fill them in on recent events in the world.

Stiltzkin also appears in the Final Fantasy Crystal Chronicles series and a different moogle with the same name appears in Kingdom Hearts II.

Puck
Puck is a runaway prince of Burmecia. Puck prefers to keep a low profile, disguised as a meddling street urchin. Vivi becomes his friend when they meet in Alexandria while trying to sneak into the play, "I Want to be Your Canary", which is where the main characters in the game meet. Later in the game, he discovers the amnesiac Sir Fratley and brings him to Cleyra, where the two of them help defend their people. He escapes with Fratley before Cleyra is destroyed and before his father can talk to him, however.

It is assumed that once Burmecia is rebuilt, Puck will assume the throne due to his father's untimely death.

Sir Fratley
Sir Fratley is Freya's long-lost love. As a dragon knight, he went out on a journey to improve his combat skills and never returned. He appears later in Cleyra with no memory of his past, or the woman he left behind. In the end, he professes his love to Freya as Burmecia is being rebuilt.

Doctor Tot
Doctor Tot was a scholar from Alexandria who moved to Treno once Queen Brahne began acting strangely. He was Garnet's tutor when she was a little girl. The group often consults him on important matters because of his extensive knowledge of just about everything. He is the one who helps Eiko write a love letter to Zidane that eventually gets misplaced. He appears first when helping Zidane and his party in Disc 2.

Lady Hilda
Lady Hilda is Cid's wife who turned him into an oglop for his womanizing. After transforming him, she escaped Lindblum on Cid's latest airship, which he named the "Hilda Garde". She is however captured by Kuja, who uses her airship for his own purposes and who ends up revealing his destructive plans for Gaia to her.

Lani
Lani is a bounty hunter that Queen Brahne hires to retrieve the Pendant worn by Princess Garnet and to kill the black mage travelling with her. She works initially with Amarant, whom she calls "Red", but later finds herself at odds with him when Amarant disapproves of her "unfair" methods of reaching her objective. Eventually she sees the error in her ways and can be found living in Madain Sari with Eiko's moogles by the end of the game. She wields a large bladed axe-like weapon and uses Black Magic. She also appeared in Lindblum, where she stayed at the Inn (leaving with several complaints to the owner) and participated in the Festival of the Hunt (as noted in the scorekeeping window at the top of the screen during the event).

Soulcage
The source of the mist which plagues Gaia, Soulcage oversees the physical manifestation of the Iifa Tree and its functions, utilizing the by-product of mist to incense the will to fight in civilization. An undead being who has existed for nearly a thousand years, his visage is a cruel mockery of a tree. Strangely, he "cannot lie", leading to some revelations in the plot.

Mikoto
Mikoto is a female genome whom the heroes rescued from Terra and brought back to Gaia. By the end of the game, she becomes the interest of the Black Mage Village. Aside from Kuja and Zidane, she is the only other Genome imbued with a soul by Garland and is their sister of sorts. In the game it is said she was to be a third 'Angel of Death' if both Kuja and Zidane were to die before completing their tasks. At the end of the game, she tells Kuja that his actions were wrong but he would be remembered by the Genomes for giving them something important: hope.

Bobby Corwen
Bobby Corwen is the name of a chocobo found in the Black Mage Village. Bobby is originally shown as an egg being cared for by two Black Mages, as one of the signs that the Black Mages in the village are capable of emotion and independent thought. He is kept in a small hut in the northeast corner of the village. The name Bobby Corwen is a play on words and reference to Final Fantasy V, the first two letters of each word making Boco, the name of Bartz's Chocobo in the fifth installment (Eiko jokes why the Black Mages always call Bobby Corwen by his full name). Bobby Corwen grows an attachment to one of the Genomes when they come to live in the Black Mage Village.

The Genomes
The Genomes are a race of soulless beings on Terra created by Garland to be the vessels for the sleeping souls of Terra after Gaia was assimilated. Kuja, Zidane, and Mikoto are technically Genomes, but Garland gave them souls, thus making them mortal. This one difference generates a wide gap between them and their emotionless brethren, one that Mikoto comes to find troubling as she involves herself with Zidane for a short period of time. When Kuja enters Trance and goes about destroying Terra, Zidane and the others selflessly risk their lives to transport the Genomes to Gaia, where they begin new lives with the hidden Black Mages. Mikoto stays with the Genomes as a kind of overseer to their new lives, although she is still unsure about how right Zidane was to take them from Terra to Gaia.

Reception and legacy
Venture Beat praised the games attention to character, and its use of humor not as an opportunity for "jokes", but to reveal character and allow players to connect with the characters when the story becomes more dramatic. "Active Time Events" were often used when players entered new cities, which was praised for regularly offering up character development. Some of the characters have very well developed plot arcs, such as Zidane, Garnet, and Vivi, while others such as Amarant are less so. Polygon notes that the cast of Final Fantasy IX strives for justice and peace at any cost, unlike later games that tend to glamorize the violence and seem to regard violence as inevitable and good.

Digital Spy rated the game the second best Final Fantasy, citing "lovable characters and hatable villians" as one of their reasons. In a poll of Japan's favorite Final Fantasy characters, Vivi and Zidane were number four and five. The characters of FFIX were featured in a television advertisement for Coca-Cola in Japan.

References

Final Fantasy IX
Final Fantasy 09